Minuscule 705 (in the Gregory-Aland numbering), ε360 (von Soden), is a Greek minuscule manuscript of the New Testament, on parchment. Palaeographically it has been assigned to the 13th century. The manuscript has complex contents. Scrivener labelled it by 887e.

Description 

The codex contains the text of the four Gospel of Luke and Gospel of John on 254 parchment leaves (size ).

The text is written in one column per page, 18 lines per page.

Text 

The Greek text of the codex is a representative of the Byzantine text-type. Hermann von Soden classified it to the textual family Kx. Kurt Aland placed it in Category V.

According to the Claremont Profile Method it represents mixed Byzantine text, related to the textual family Kx in Luke 1 and Luke 20. In Luke 10 no profile was made.

In Luke 8:21 it reads αυτον instead of αυτους; the reading αυτον is supported by Papyrus 75, and Codex Veronensis.

History 

Scrivener and Gregory dated the manuscript to the 13th century. Currently the manuscript is dated by the Institute for New Testament Textual Research to the 13th century.

In 1521 it was in Gortyna on Crete.

It was added to the list of New Testament manuscript by Gregory (705). Gregory saw the manuscript in 1883.

Formerly it was housed in London, in Quaritch (Catalogue 94, No. 146), then it belonged to Lord Amherst of Hackney.

Currently, the manuscript is housed at the Dumbarton Oaks (Ms. 4, acc. no. 74.1) in Washington, D.C.

See also 

 List of New Testament minuscules
 Biblical manuscript
 Textual criticism

References

Further reading 

 

Greek New Testament minuscules
13th-century biblical manuscripts